Thorea is a genus of freshwater algae in the Phylum Rhodophyta (red algae). Thorea is a small alga with filaments up to 200 cm long, dark green in colour and not red as are marine Rhodophyta. The filaments have only as few secondary branches.

Thorea is distributed throughout temperate and tropical regions.

The genus was circumscribed by Jean Baptiste Bory de Saint-Vincent in Ann. Mus. Natl. Hist. Nat. vol.12 on page 126 in  1808.

The genus name of Thorea is in honour of Jean Thore (1762–1823), who was a French botanist and physician who practiced medicine in the town of Dax.

Species
As accepted by WoRMS;
Thorea bachmannii 
Thorea brodensis 
Thorea clavata 
Thorea conturba 
Thorea flagelliformis 
Thorea gaudichaudii 
Thorea hispida 
Thorea okadae 
Thorea okaidai 
Thorea prowsei 
Thorea riekei 
Thorea siamensis 
Thorea violacea 
Thorea zollingeri 

Former species;
Thorea andina  accepted as Thorea hispida (synonym)
Thorea chilensis  accepted as Myriogloea chilensis  (synonym)
Thorea lehmannii  accepted as Thorea hispida (synonym)
Thorea ramosissima  accepted as Thorea hispida (synonym)

Thorea in UK
There is only one species of Thorea in the British Isles: Thorea hispida  (Synonyms: Thorea anadina , T. lehmannii  and T. ramosissima ).

The first record of Thorea ramosissima in the British Isles is in Harvey's Manual (1841): Found in a pool in a bog in the Co Donegal Mountains, going from Letterkenny to Dunfanaghy; July. These specimens are in the Ulster Museum (BEL: F42–F47), but proved to have been incorrectly identified and were specimens of Batrachospermum.

References

Red algae genera
Florideophyceae